Heping railway station serves Heping County in the city of Heyuan in Guangdong Province, southern China.

References

Stations on the Beijing–Kowloon Railway
Railway stations in Guangdong